The 2008–09 Pittsburgh Panthers men's basketball team represented the University of Pittsburgh in the 2008–09 NCAA Division I men's basketball season. The head coach was Jamie Dixon, who was serving for his 6th year as head coach at Pittsburgh and 10th overall at the university. The team played its home games in the Petersen Events Center in Pittsburgh, Pennsylvania.

Outlook
The Pittsburgh Panthers, defending  Big East Conference tournament champions, came off a 27–10 (10–8) record in the 2007–08 season which included their seventh straight 20-win season, seventh straight season with 10 league wins in the Big East Conference, and a seventh straight NCAA tournament appearance.  Pitt advanced to the second round of the 2008 NCAA Tournament, where they lost to Michigan State. That season also marked the seventh time in the last eight seasons that Pitt advanced to the Big East tournament Championship title game, which tied for the most appearances in league history.  Pitt began the season returning three starters, each of its top three scorers, and seven of its top 10 players from the previous year.  Pitt found itself ranked among the top 10 teams nationally in most preseason polls and publications. Five newcomers, including one junior college transfer and four freshman, joined Pitt for the 2008–09 season.

Coaching staff

Roster

Schedule
Pitt's 2008–09 schedule included, in addition to their Big East slate, nine non-conference opponents that were ranked the previous season in the nation's top-100 Ratings Percentage Index, nine opponents that advanced to post-season play, and five that advanced to the NCAA Tournament.

|-
!colspan=9 style="background:#091C44; color:#CEC499;" | Scrimmage

|-
!colspan=9 style="background:#091C44; color:#CEC499;" | Exhibition

|-
!colspan=9 style="background:#091C44; color:#CEC499;" | Regular season

|-
!colspan=9 style="background:#091C44; color:#CEC499;" | Postseason†Big East Men's Basketball Championship

|-
!colspan=9 style="background:#091C44; color:#CEC499;" | NCAA tournament

|-

|-

|-

Rankings

Accomplishments

 During the 8th week of the season, the Panthers were ranked No. 1 in both the AP and Coaches poll. This was the first time in program history that the basketball team held the top ranking in either poll.
 The Panthers were named the champion of the 2nd Annual Legends Classic Tournament. Sam Young was named the tournament MVP.
 Pitt won their first and second game in their history over a team ranked No. 1 in the AP or Coaches poll when they defeated number one ranked Connecticut 76–68 in Hartford on February 16, 2009, and again defeated the top-ranked Huskies 70–60 at home on March 7, 2009.
 Pitt won the most regular-season conference games in school history (15) and achieved their best-ever regular-season record in Big East Conference play (15–3, 0.833).
 Panther center DeJuan Blair was named Big East Player of the Year, an award he shared with UConn center Hasheem Thabeet.
 Pitt received its record eighth straight bid to the NCAA tournament and its record ninth straight post-season national tournament bid.
 Pitt received its first-ever number-one seed in the NCAA tournament.
 Pitt coach Jamie Dixon, with his 162nd win coming in the NCAA Tournament over Oklahoma State, broke the NCAA Division I record for most victories in the first six seasons as a head coach formerly held by North Carolina State coach Everett Case.
 Pitt reached the NCAA Sweet Sixteen for the second time in three years and the fifth time in the last eight seasons.
 Pitt tied a school record set in 2003–04 for the most wins in a season, with 31 victories, and won 30 games for only the second time in school history.
 Pitt's senior class of Sam Young, Levance Fields, and Tyrell Biggs won 112 games during their four-year Pitt careers, giving them the most wins of any senior class in school history.
 Pitt reached the NCAA Elite Eight for the first time since 1974. In doing so, it defeated the highest-seeded NCAA Tournament in school history (seeding began in 1979) and won three NCAA Tournament games for the first time.
 Jamie Dixon won the Naismith Men's College Basketball Coach of the Year as well as the Jim Phelan Mid-season Coach of the Year award.

References

Pittsburgh
Pittsburgh Panthers men's basketball seasons
Pittsburgh
Pittsburgh Pan
Pittsburgh Pan